Lorenz Cederbaum (born 26 October 1946 in Braunschweig, Germany) is a German physical chemist. 

He studied physics at the University of Munich and obtained his diplome in 1970, his Ph.D. in 1972 under Georg Hohlneicher, and habilitation in 1976.  He was professor at the University of Freiburg before becoming professor for theoretical chemistry at the University of Heidelberg in 1979.

L. S. Cederbaum is member of the International Academy of Quantum Molecular Science and the Academy of Sciences Leopoldina.

Research areas
 Calculation of electronic states and transitions using many-particle methods (computational chemistry)
 Spectroscopy and radiationless relaxation of polyatomic molecules 
 Electron-molecule scattering, photoionization and Auger decay
 Wave packet dynamics (the multi-configuration time-dependent Hartree method).
 Chaos and statistics 
 Structure and dynamics of quasi-one-dimensional systems 
 Stable multiply charged anions of isolated small molecules and clusters 
 Fundamental aspects, electronic structure and dynamics of atoms and molecules in strong magnetic fields
 Bose-Einstein Condensation
 Interatomic/Intermolecular Coulombic Decay (ICD)

External links
University of Heidelberg Biography (German)
IAQMS: Lorenz S. Cederbaum

1946 births
Scientists from Braunschweig
German physical chemists
Science teachers
Members of the International Academy of Quantum Molecular Science
Ludwig Maximilian University of Munich alumni
Academic staff of Heidelberg University
Living people
Computational chemists